Autry is both a given name and surname. Notable people with the name include:

Autry Beamon (born 1953), American football player
Autry Inman (1929–1988), American musician
Alan Autry (born 1952), American actor
Chick Autry (first baseman) (1885–1976), American baseball player
Chick Autry (catcher) (1903–1950), American baseball player
Darnell Autry (born 1976), American football player
Denico Autry (born 1990), American football player
Gene Autry (1907–1998), American singer, actor, businessman, owner of the Los Angeles Angels baseball team
Jackie Autry (born 1941), American executive
Micajah Autry (1793–1836), Alamo defender

Masculine given names